Sarah Andrews (died 24 July 2019) was an American geologist and author of twelve science-based mystery novels and several short stories. Many of the novels feature "clear-thinking, straight-talking" forensic geologist Em Hansen and take place in the Rocky Mountains region of the United States. Her novels have been praised for their combination of science and detective work within the mystery genre. Andrews, her husband Damon, and son Duncan died in a plane crash in Nebraska on the 24th of July, 2019.

Life and career

Sarah Andrews grew up in Connecticut and in Ossining, New York, USA. Her father was an artist and art teacher and her mother, a teacher of English and comparative religions. Since childhood, she had a passion for exploring the great outdoors, including sailing with her father and wandering solo through the woods and fields during the family's long summers in rural Maine.

Andrews left New York to attend Colorado College. In a creative writing class, she discovered that she "had a knack for storytelling." Later, inspired by her Aunt Lysbeth's profession, Andrews selected a geology course to fulfill a science requirement. She found herself among people who thought the way she did, and that she even excelled "taking in graphical information holistically, seeing the patterns, understanding their meaning, and making interpretations from them." Her aptitude inspired her to earn a BA in geology.

After college, Andrews stayed in Colorado, working first as a plumber's apprentice on a construction site south of Colorado Springs. When kidded by coworkers about where her "fancy education" had gotten her, she happily taught them about the ancient seaway that had once existed in the area, sharing the fossils she had found up while digging for drain pipes that had been buried by the backhoe.

Andrews next took a job at the U.S. Geological Survey, working under legendary Grand Canyon geologist Edwin D. McKee from 1974 to 1980.  In her work, she studied modern sand dunes in order to understand ancient sand dune rock formations.

She went on to earn a MS in Earth Resources from Colorado State University, studying with Frank Ethridge, then worked as a petroleum geologist with Amoco and ANGUS Petroleum.  After being laid off during the oil "bust" of 1986, she moved to California, where she worked as an environmental consultant, began to write, and lectured in the Geology Department at Sonoma State University.

Awards and honors
In 2005, Andrews was awarded an Artists and Writers grant by the National Science Foundation and deployed through McMurdo Station, Antarctica to remote field camps to research an eleventh novel featuring fictional glaciologist Valena Walker. Andrews has won numerous other awards for her writings, including the Geological Society of America President's Medal and the American Association of Petroleum Geologists Journalism Award, now called the Geosciences in the Media Award. Other of her awards include: 
 2009 Louis T. Benezet Award from Colorado College
 2008 Fellow of the Geological Society of America
 2006 Antarctic Service Medal
 2003 Special Award of the Association of Engineering Geologists
 2001 James T. Shea Award of the National Association of Geoscience Teachers
 1997 Journalism Award of the Rocky Mountain Association of Geologists

Death 
She, her husband, and son died in a private plane crash in Chadron, Nebraska, on 24 July 2019 on the way home from an air show in Wisconsin. As of 13 August 2019, the cause of the crash was under investigation. Andrews' life and works are memorialized by the Geological Society of America. The Sarah Andrews Brown Papers are archived in the Special Collections of Charles L. Tutt Library, Colorado College, Colorado Springs.

Inspiration and influences 

In one of her jobs as a geologist, Andrews entertained herself during dull meetings by "picking someone across the table as a murder victim and then trying to figure out who killed him." These imaginings and her colleagues' positive reception of them led to her publishing mystery novels.

The white-collar crimes in Andrews' first three novels are drawn from real events that she or colleagues observed. The murders, on the other hand, are included for the drama.

Geologist Gene Shinn "worked for years on Andrews" to incorporate into one of her novels his theory of dust floating from somewhere in Africa across the Atlantic Ocean to the United States. On September 11, 2001, she called his office, and the conversation inspired her book Killer Dust.

Andrews cites Dorothy Sayers, Tony Hillerman, and Agatha Christie as favorite mystery writers.

Thinking about geology 

Beyond her careers as a geologist and a novelist, Andrews has reflected on geology itself from a number of angles. Her whitepaper "Spatial Thinking with a Difference: An Unorthodox Treatise on the Mind of the Geologist" describes how she uses episodic simulation to understand past and future geologic events. She has considered how geologists act as detectives and how her experience as a woman impacted her approach to geology. And in a short note on geophilosophy, she points out that it is "important to know that science involves not just the collection of facts, but also a variety of logics and reasonings, some of which vary from one division of science to another."

Bibliography

Em Hansen Mysteries
 Tensleep - 1994
 A Fall in Denver - 1995
 Mother Nature - 1997
 Only Flesh and Bones - 1998
 Bone Hunter - 1999
 An Eye For Gold - 2000
 Fault Line - 2002
 Killer Dust - 2003
 Earth Colors - 2004
 Dead Dry - 2005
 Rock Bottom - 2012

Other novels
 In Cold Pursuit  - 2007

References

External links
Official website, archived

2019 deaths
20th-century American novelists
21st-century American novelists
American women geologists
American geologists
American mystery writers
American women novelists
Colorado College alumni
Colorado State University alumni
Sonoma State University faculty
Women mystery writers
20th-century American women writers
21st-century American women writers
Herben family